Coleophora albarracinica is a moth of the family Coleophoridae. It is found in Spain.

References

albarracinica
Moths described in 1961
Moths of Europe